Pig Memorial is a memorial in Phra Borom Maha Ratchawang sub-district, Phra Nakhon district, Bangkok. It is located in the inner city or Rattanakosin Island which is a historic area of the city.

Pig Memorial was built in 1913, the year of Queen Saovabha Phongsri's 50th Birthday Anniversary. Its official name is "Sahachart Memorial" (อนุสาวรีย์สหชาติ), which refers to "The Memorial of Those Who Were Born in The Same Year", which were Prince Narisara Nuvadtivongs, Phraya Phiphat Kosa (Celestino Xavier), and Phraya Ratcha Songkhram (Kon Hongsakul), all of the three had jointly built the memorial as a gesture of gratitude to the queen. The pig sculpture of the memorial is made of gilded cast metal. Initially, the sculpture was resting on large stone pillars, which have since been replaced by a higher, mountain-shaped concrete base. Its purpose is to honor the year of the pig which was the queen's year of birth, as well as the three donors. The memorial was designed by Prince Narisara Nuvadtivongs, who was one of the donors.

And Pi Kun Bridge or Thai called "Saphan Pi Kun" (สะพานปีกุน) or commonly "Saphan Mu" (สะพานหมู). The bridge was built on the same occasion. Its name refers to "The Bridge of Year of The Pig". Its structure is cemented adjacent to the memorial, which is located in the west of the bridge. Pi Kun Bridge is a pedestrian overpass across Khlong Khu Mueang Doem (old city moat), better known as Khlong Lot (tube canal) alike other bridges nearby such as Saphan Hok and Saphan Mon. The bridge spans the Rop Krung canal between Atsadang and Rachini roads.

At present, they have been registered as ancient monument in Bangkok.

References 

Phra Nakhon district
Bridges in Bangkok
Registered ancient monuments in Bangkok
Monuments and memorials in Thailand

1913 establishments in Siam